Garh is a village in Bedipur Gram panchayat in Bilhaur Tehsil, Kanpur Nagar district, Uttar Pradesh, India. Village Code is 149974.

References

Villages in Kanpur Nagar district